The Pedro Muñoz Seca Municipal Theater (Teatro Municipal Pedro Muñoz Seca) is a 600-seat theater located in El Puerto de Santa María, Cadiz, Spain.  It is named after Pedro Muñoz Seca, a playwright originally from the city.

The theater is located in Polvorista Plaza (Plaza del Polvorista), in a building that served as a barracks for a cavalry regiment of the Spanish Army in the 18th century.  El Puerto de Santa María's former Main Theater (Teatro Principal) was destroyed in a fire in 1984; this new Municipal Theater was inaugurated on October 27, 2007.

Buildings and structures in El Puerto de Santa María
Theatres in Spain
Tourist attractions in Andalusia